Captain Anthony David Hutton OBE (1 September 1932 – 5 April 2015) was a British Royal Navy officer of the post-Second World War era who organised the evacuation of about 2500 British and Cypriot refugees during the Turkish invasion of Cyprus in 1974.

Hutton was born in Chislehurst, Kent, the son of Rear Admiral Reginald Hutton, who had participated in the Battle of Jutland during the First World War and had been awarded the Distinguished Service Order and two bars during the Second World War.

Hutton was educated at Dartmouth Royal Naval College.

References

1932 births
2015 deaths
Officers of the Order of the British Empire
People from Chislehurst
Royal Navy officers